Valery Yakovlevich Komissarov (born 12 April 1965) is a host, producer, director, and screenwriter of numerous television shows. Financial Times named him “the father of Russian reality show". He is a former member of the party United Russia, former State Duma deputy (1999–2011).

Biography
Komissarov was born on April 12, 1965, in Kharkiv (former USSR, now Ukraine). In 1987, he graduated from Moscow Institute of Steel and Alloys, and earned a diploma in directing from the Institute for Advanced Training of Television and Radio Broadcasting Workers. In 1987, he started working at the Lublin Casting and Mechanical Plant and at the State Institute for the Design of Metallurgical Enterprises (GIPROMEZ). In 1988, he was hired as an administrator for the Youth Editorial Board at the Central Television and Radio Broadcasting Company of the USSR. In 1989–1992, he worked as a special correspondent for the then-popular television program Outlook Vzglyad and co-wrote Visiting a Fairy Tale, a television series for children.

From November 1993 to March 1995, Komissarov created and hosted the Channel of Illusions, a television show produced by ATV on Channel 1 Ostankino. Then he moved to the Moscow Television Channel (MTK), where, from April 1995 to July 1996, he hosted shows Men’s and Women's Stories and The Plainspoken Men’s Club. He then created and hosted the television show My Family, which aired from July 1996 on the television network ORT and from January 1998 to August 2003 on RTR (which later was renamed Rossiya and still later became Rossiya-1). He also wrote and hosted the shows Mary's Grove (1998) and The Ideal Man (2001) on the same network.

He went on to write and produce multiple television shows, including To Your Health!, Family News, What Does A Woman Want?”, “Girl's Tears”, The Burden Of Money, House, and Personal News Service a talk show Okna (Windows) and reality show Dom-2 (House 2)

In 2011, Komissarov started airing the reality show Mother in Law on the television network Peretz. His television show Machine and his sketch show Happy End were aired on the same network, while the television network "Ю" ran his daily talk show I am right (#Yaprava). From November 16 to December 30, 2015, he directed and hosted Our Man, a television show aired on Russia-1.

Komissarov lives with his wife, four daughters and one son.

References

External links
 Биография
  Что стало с ведущим «Моей семьи» Валерием Комиссаровым
 

1965 births
Living people
Politicians from Kharkiv
Soviet journalists
Russian male journalists
Russian journalists
Soviet television presenters
Russian television presenters
Russian film directors
20th-century Russian journalists
21st-century Russian journalists
National University of Science and Technology MISiS alumni
United Russia politicians
Russian media executives
Russian producers
20th-century Russian politicians
21st-century Russian politicians
Third convocation members of the State Duma (Russian Federation)
Fourth convocation members of the State Duma (Russian Federation)
Fifth convocation members of the State Duma (Russian Federation)